Chicago Story is an American crime drama television series that aired for 13 episodes on NBC from March 6 to June 11, 1982, following a 2-hour television film pilot that was broadcast earlier on March 15, 1981.

Synopsis
The series followed the work and lives of several Chicago lawyers, police officers, and doctors. The series was similar to Hill Street Blues in that it was less about action scenes and more about the stresses of working in law enforcement and medicine. The show did not catch on with viewers and lasted only thirteen episodes.

The cast included Maud Adams and Kristoffer Tabori as Dr. Judith Bergstrom and Dr. Max Carson, doctors at Cook County Hospital; Craig T. Nelson, Vincent Baggetta and Molly Cheek as attorneys Kenneth A. Dutton, Lou Pellegrino and Megan Powers. Dutton was a prosecutor and Pellegrino was a defense attorney; Powers was a lawyer both men were interested in; and Dennis Franz, Richard Lawson and Daniel Hugh Kelly appeared as police officers Joe Gilland, O.Z. Tate and Frank Wajorski, respectively.  Gilland was a beat cop, while Tate and Wajorski were detectives.

Intermixed within, especially during the opening title sequence, was plenty of Chicago scenery, including the John Hancock Center; Merchandise Mart; Michigan Avenue; Wrigley Building; Willis Tower (then known as Sears Tower); Aon Center; (then known as the Standard Oil Building), the Chicago Theater and its famous marquee; Lake Shore Drive; the then-headquarters of the Chicago Sun-Times; the Chicago Water Tower; Marina City; the Chicago 'L' and various other sights.  One of the settings was the then-Cook County Hospital.

Chicago Story was notable for ninety-minute-long episodes, which hadn't been attempted on network prime-time TV since The Virginian left the air in 1971. The show was pared down to an hour late in its run, including broadcasting edited versions of episodes that had already aired. By focusing on Chicago, it presaged the Chicago franchise (including Chicago Fire, Chicago P.D. and Chicago Med) some thirty years later, also on NBC.

Episodes were rebroadcast on TNT Network in 1994.

The series aired in the United Kingdom on BBC1 in 1982.

Cast
Maud Adams as Dr. Judith Bergstrom
Vincent Baggetta as Lou Pellegrino
Molly Cheek as Megan Powers
Dennis Franz as Officer Joe Gilland
Daniel Hugh Kelly as Det. Frank Wajorski
Richard Lawson as Det. O.Z. Tate
Craig T. Nelson as Kenneth A. Dutton
Kristoffer Tabori as Dr. Max Carson
John Mahoney as Lt. Roselli
Joe Pantoliano as Cooney

Episodes

References

External links
 

1982 American television series debuts
1982 American television series endings
1980s American crime drama television series
1980s American legal television series
1980s American medical television series
NBC original programming
Television shows set in Chicago
Television series by MGM Television
English-language television shows